Enrique Carrión Olivares (Santiago de Cuba, 11 October 1967) is a Cuban amateur boxer best known to win the 1989 World Amateur Boxing Championships at bantamweight.

He won the 1989 final against Bulgarian Serafim Todorov who beat him in 1991 and at featherweight in 1993.
He didn't participate in the 1992 Olympics, where his replacement was future professional world champion Joel Casamayor, who secured the gold medal for Cuba.

References

External links
1989 World Boxing Championships
1991 World Boxing Championships
1993 World Boxing Championships

1967 births
Living people
Sportspeople from Santiago de Cuba
Bantamweight boxers
Featherweight boxers
Boxers at the 1991 Pan American Games
Pan American Games gold medalists for Cuba
Cuban male boxers
AIBA World Boxing Championships medalists
Pan American Games medalists in boxing
Central American and Caribbean Games gold medalists for Cuba
Competitors at the 1993 Central American and Caribbean Games
Competitors at the 1998 Central American and Caribbean Games
Central American and Caribbean Games medalists in boxing
Medalists at the 1991 Pan American Games
20th-century Cuban people
21st-century Cuban people